Karl-Erik "Kalle" Grundel (born 2 October 1948) is a Swedish former rally driver and military pilot. He made his international breakthrough in 1982, driving a Volkswagen Golf GTi for Volkswagen's factory team. He achieved his first and only podium finish in the World Rally Championship in 1986, steering his Ford RS200 to third place in the Swedish Rally.

References

External links 
eWRC profile

1948 births
Living people
Swedish rally drivers
Swedish Touring Car Championship drivers
World Rally Championship drivers
World Rally Championship people
European Rally Championship drivers
Peugeot Sport drivers
Volkswagen Motorsport drivers